The Diverse Yusef Lateef is a jazz album by saxophonist Yusef Lateef released in 1970. In it are mixed influences from rhythm and blues and soul music (particularly on "Live Humble") and world music (notably on "A Long Time Ago" or "Chandra").

Track listing
All compositions by Yusef Lateef except as indicated.
"Live Humble" – 6:48
"A Long Time Ago" – 6:37
"Eboness" (Roy Brooks) – 4:44
"Chandra" – 9:37

Personnel
Yusef Lateef – tenor saxophone, track 1 - flute, 2-4 - bamboo flute, Chinese globular flute, Chinese Buddhist flute, kulintang, -track 2 Chinese cymbals, tambura, string arrangement
Richard Tee – piano - track 1
Chuck Rainey – Fender bass
Cecil McBee – acoustic bass
Ray Baretto – congas - track 1
Bernard Purdie – drums, timbales
Hugh Lawson – piano, 3 and 4 Indian bells - track 2
Roy Brooks – drums, shofar, Chinese gong, large conga drum
Selwart Clarke, Jesse Tryon, Alfred Brown, Kermit Moore – string quartet - track 4 
The Sweet Inspirations – vocal backgrounds - tracks 1 and 2
Joel Dorn – producer

References

1970 albums
Atlantic Records albums
Yusef Lateef albums
Jazz fusion albums by American artists
World music albums by American artists